Francesco Antonio Zimbalo (Lecce, 1567 – Lecce, 1631) was an Italian architect.

He was a prominent architects during the Baroque period in the town of Lecce in southern Italy. He designed the three portals of the façade and the altar of San Francesco di Paola of the Basilica of Santa Croce. He was the grandfather of Giuseppe Zimbalo.

References 

Italian Baroque architects
1567 births
People from Lecce
1631 deaths